Charimachilis relicta is a species of jumping bristletail in the family Machilidae.

Subspecies
These five subspecies belong to the species Charimachilis relicta:
 Charimachilis relicta egatensis Bach, 1982
 Charimachilis relicta insularis Janetschek, 1957
 Charimachilis relicta melitensis Stach, 1958
 Charimachilis relicta meridionalis Janetschek, 1957
 Charimachilis relicta relicta Janetschek, 1954

References

Further reading

 
 
 

Archaeognatha
Articles created by Qbugbot
Insects described in 1954